Jamie Yeung Zhen-mei (born 8 July 1997) is a Hong Kong competitive swimmer.

She competed in the women's 50 metre breaststroke at the 2019 World Aquatics Championships held in Gwangju, South Korea. In 2020, She competed in the women's 4×100 metre medley relay during the Tokyo 2020 Summer Olympics.

References

External links
 

1997 births
Living people
Hong Kong female breaststroke swimmers
Place of birth missing (living people)
Swimmers at the 2014 Summer Youth Olympics
Swimmers at the 2014 Asian Games
Swimmers at the 2018 Asian Games
Asian Games silver medalists for Hong Kong
Asian Games bronze medalists for Hong Kong
Asian Games medalists in swimming
Medalists at the 2014 Asian Games
Medalists at the 2018 Asian Games
Swimmers at the 2020 Summer Olympics
Olympic swimmers of Hong Kong